This is a list of the main career statistics of professional Spanish tennis player Feliciano López.

Performance timelines

Singles
Current through the  2023 Mexican Open .

Doubles

+ Only participate in the 2004 Davis Cup First round.
1 Including appearances in Grand Slam, ATP Tour main draw matches, and Summer Olympics.
2 Including matches in Grand Slam, ATP Tour events, Summer Olympics, Davis Cup, World Team Cup and ATP Cup.
* not held due to COVID-19 pandemic.

Grand Slam finals

Doubles: 2 (1 title, 1 runner-up)

Masters 1000 finals

Doubles: 2 (2 runner-ups)

Olympic medal matches

Doubles: 1 (1 fourth place)

ATP career finals

Singles: 18 (7 titles, 11 runner-ups)

Doubles: 17 (6 titles, 11 runners-up)

ATP Challenger and ITF Futures finals

Singles: 7 (4–3)

Doubles: 5 (1–4)

Junior Grand Slam finals

Doubles: 1 (1 runner-up)

Record against other players
López's match record against those who have been ranked in the top 10, with those who have been No. 1 in boldface

  Tomáš Berdych 9–6
  Rainer Schüttler 8–1
  David Ferrer 8–11
  Gilles Simon 6–3
  Janko Tipsarević 5–1
  Juan Mónaco 5–3
  Milos Raonic 5–3
  Mikhail Youzhny 5–3
  Fernando Verdasco 5–6
  Nikolay Davydenko 4–2
  Ivan Ljubičić 4–2
  Marat Safin 4–2
  Robin Söderling 4–4
  Mardy Fish 4–5
  Rafael Nadal 4–10
  Alex Corretja 3–1
  Juan Carlos Ferrero 3–1
  Fabio Fognini 3–1
  Paradorn Srichaphan 3–1
  Kei Nishikori 3–4
  Marin Čilić 3–5
  Juan Martín del Potro 3–5
  John Isner 3–5
  Stanislas Wawrinka 3–5
  Radek Štěpánek 3–8
  Félix Mantilla 2–0
  Gaël Monfils 2–0
  Guillermo Cañas 2–1
  Tim Henman 2–1
  James Blake 2–2
  Gaston Gaudio 2–2
  Jiří Novák 2–2
  Jack Sock 2–2
  Roberto Bautista Agut 2–3
  Grigor Dimitrov 2–4
  Lleyton Hewitt 2–4
  Jürgen Melzer 2–5
  Nicolas Lapentti 1–0
  Nicolás Almagro 1–1
  Pablo Carreno Busta 1–1
  Daniil Medvedev 1–1
  Carlos Moyá 1–1
  Mark Philippoussis 1–1
  Andrey Rublev 1–1
  Andre Agassi 1–2
  Karol Kucera 1–2
  Nicolas Massu 1–2
  Diego Schwartzman 1–2
  Mario Ančić 1–3
  Arnaud Clément 1–3
  David Goffin 1–3
  Fernando González 1–3
  Karen Khachanov 1–3
  Dominic Thiem 1–3
  Marcos Baghdatis 1–4
  Ernests Gulbis 1–4
  Lucas Pouille 1–5
  Guillermo Coria 1–6
  Richard Gasquet 1–7
  Andy Roddick 1–7
  Novak Djokovic 1–9
  Matteo Berrettini 0–1
  Yevgeny Kafelnikov 0–1
  Gustavo Kuerten 0–1
  Todd Martin 0–1
  Alexander Zverev 0–1
  Frances Tiafoe 0-1
  Jonas Björkman 0–2
  Wayne Ferreira 0–2
  Hubert Hurkacz 0–2
  Joachim Johansson 0–2
  Nicolas Kiefer 0–2
  David Nalbandian 0–2
  Denis Shapovalov 0–2
  Thomas Johansson 0–3
  Tommy Haas 0–3
  Sébastien Grosjean 0–4
  Kevin Anderson 0–5
  Tommy Robredo 0–5
  Jo-Wilfried Tsonga 0–6
  Andy Murray 0–11
  Roger Federer 0–13

* Statistics correct .

Top 10 wins
López has a  record against players who were, at the time the match was played, ranked in the top 10.

* Statistics correct .

ATP Tour career earnings

* Statistics correct .

Records
 These records were attained in the Open Era.
 Records in bold indicate peerless achievements.
 Records in italics are currently active streaks.

See also 

 List of Grand Slam men's doubles champions
 ATP Tour records
 Spain Davis Cup team
 List of Spain Davis Cup team representatives
 Fastest recorded tennis serves
 Sport in Spain

Notes

References

External links
 
 
 

López, Feliciano